Birao Airport  is a rural airstrip serving Birao, a village in the Vakaga prefecture of the Central African Republic.

See also

Transport in the Central African Republic
List of airports in the Central African Republic

References

External links 
OpenStreetMap - Birao Airport
OurAirports - Birao Airport

Airports in the Central African Republic
Buildings and structures in Vakaga